State Road 886 (SR 886), also known as Port Boulevard, is a causeway connecting the Port of Miami with downtown Miami, Florida.  Its western terminus is an intersection with U.S. Route 1 (US 1 or Biscayne Boulevard) just north of Bayside Marketplace, and its eastern terminus is at the Port of Miami entrance. It received its FDOT designation in 1980.

Route description

State Road 886 begins where Port Boulevard and 6th Street intersect Biscayne Boulevard, which carries U.S. Route 1. The road passes American Airlines Arena and ascends the approach of the Port Boulevard Bridge over Biscayne Bay. On the other side of the bridge, SR 886 ends at the entrance to the Port of Miami.

History
This road was signed as SR 886 in 1980.

Prior to the construction of the current high-level causeway, which replaced an older causeway with a drawbridge, a tunnel connecting the Port of Miami and Interstate 95 was contemplated as a replacement instead, but failed to attract support from the City of Miami commission.

A similar proposal for a tunnel connecting the port with SR A1A on nearby Watson Island was made in the 2000s and eventually approved and on May 24, 2010, construction began on the Miami Port Tunnel.

Major intersections

References

External links

886
886
886
1980 establishments in Florida
State highways in the United States shorter than one mile